The 94th Bombardment Wing was a unit of the United States Army Air Forces. Its last assignment was with the Eighth Air Force, 1st Air Division, based at RAF Alconbury, England. It was inactivated on 18 June 1945.

Command and control organization for VIII Bomber Command.   Had no groups until April 1944. Flew in combat in the European theater from 2  June until 14 August 1944 when its groups were reassigned.

Lineage
 Constituted as 94th Bombardment Wing (Heavy) on 2 November 1943
 Activated on 12 December 1943
 Redesignated 94th Combat Bombardment Wing (Heavy) in August 1943
 Disbanded on 18 June 1945.

Assignments
 VIII Bomber Command, 12 December 1943
 1st Bombardment (later, 1 Air) Division, 22 February 1944 – 18 June 1945

Units assigned
 351st Bombardment Group, 15 December 1943 – 23 June 1945
 401st Bombardment Group, 8 January 1944 – 20 June 1945
 457th Bombardment Group, 21 January 1944 – 21 June 1945

Stations
 RAF Polebrook, England, 12 December 1943
 RAF Alconbury, England, 12–18 June 1945

References

 Maurer, Maurer (1983). Air Force Combat Units Of World War II. Maxwell AFB, Alabama: Office of Air Force History. .

Military units and formations established in 1943
094
Military units and formations disestablished in 1945